Italian Canadians comprise Canadians who have full or partial Italian heritage and Italians who migrated from Italy or reside in Canada. According to the 2021 Census of Canada, 1,546,390 Canadians (4.3% of the total population) claimed full or partial Italian ancestry. They comprise a subgroup of Southern European Canadians which is a further subgroup of European Canadians. The census enumerates the entire Canadian population, which consists of Canadian citizens (by birth and by naturalization), landed immigrants and non-permanent residents and their families living with them in Canada. Residing mainly in central urban industrial metropolitan areas, Italian Canadians are the seventh largest self-identified ethnic group in Canada behind French, English, Irish, Scottish, German and Chinese Canadians.

Italian immigration to Canada started as early as the mid 19th century. A substantial influx of Italian immigration to Canada began in the early 20th century, primarily from rural southern Italy, with immigrants primarily settling in Toronto and Montreal. During the interwar period after World War I, new immigration laws in the 1920s limited Italian immigration. During World War II, approximately 600 to 700 Italian Canadian men were interned between 1940 and 1943 as potentially dangerous enemy aliens with alleged fascist connections.

A second wave of immigration occurred after the World War II, and between the early 1950s and the mid-1960s, approximately 20,000 to 30,000 Italians immigrated to Canada each year, many of the men working in the construction industry upon settling. Pier 21 in Halifax, Nova Scotia was an influential port of Italian immigration between 1928 until it ceased operations in 1971, where 471,940 individuals came to Canada from Italy, making them the third largest ethnic group to immigrate to Canada during that time period. In the late 1960s, the Italian economy experienced a period of growth and recovery, removing one of the primary incentives for emigration. The importance of the family unit of Italian Canadians has provided a central role in the adaptation of newer socioeconomic realities. In 2010, the Government of Ontario proclaimed the month of June as Italian Heritage Month, and in 2017, the Government of Canada also declared the month of June as Italian Heritage Month across Canada.

History 

The first explorer to coastal North America was the Venetian John Cabot (Giovanni Caboto), making landfall in Cape Bonavista, Newfoundland and Labrador, in 1497. His voyage to Canada and other parts of the Americas was followed by his son Sebastian Cabot (Sebastiano Caboto) and Giovanni da Verrazzano. The first Canadian census enumerating the population was not conducted until 1871. At this time, there were only 1,035 people of Italian origin that lived in Canada. A number of Italians were imported, often as "soldiers of fortune" and "men of letters", to work as navvies in the construction of the Canadian Pacific Railway. In 1904, 3,144 of the 8,576 seasonal Canadian Pacific Railway workforce were Italian men.

A substantial influx of Italian immigration to Canada began in the early 20th century when over 60,000 Italians moved to Canada between 1900 and 1913. These were largely peasants from southern Italy and agrarian parts of the north-east (Veneto and Friuli). In 1905, the Royal Commission appointed to Inquire into the Immigration of Italian Labourers to Montreal and alleged Fraudulent Practices of Employment Agencies was launched into deceptive tactics used by padroni, labour brokers that recruited Italian workers for Canadian employers. These numbers were dwarfed in comparison to those of the United States, however, where about four million Italians immigrated between 1880 and 1920. Italian Canadians primarily immigrated to Toronto and Montreal. In Toronto, the Italian population increased from 4,900 in 1911, to 9,000 in 1921, constituting almost two percent of Toronto's population. Italians in Toronto and in Montreal soon established ethnic enclaves, especially Little Italies in Toronto and in Montreal. Smaller communities also arose in Vancouver, Hamilton, Niagara Falls, Guelph, Windsor, Thunder Bay, Sault Ste. Marie, Ottawa and Sherbrooke. Many also settled in mining communities in British Columbia (Trail), Alberta (Crowsnest Pass), Cape Breton Island (Inverness), and Northern Ontario (Sault Ste. Marie and Fort William).

This migration was largely halted after World War I, new immigration laws in the 1920s, and the Great Depression limited Italian immigration. Approximately 40,000 Italians came to Canada during the interwar period, predominantly from southern Italy where an economic depression and overpopulation had left many families in poverty. During World War II, Italian Canadians were regarded with suspicion and faced a great deal of discrimination. As part of the War Measures Act, 31,000 Italian Canadians were labelled as "enemy aliens" with alleged fascist connections, and between 1940 and 1943, approximately 600 to 700 of these Italian Canadian men were arrested and sent to internment camps, such as Camp Petawawa—in what was the period of Italian Canadian internment. While many Italian-Canadians had initially supported fascism and Benito Mussolini's regime for its role in enhancing Italy's presence on the world stage, most Italians in Canada did not harbour any ill will against Canada and few remained committed followers of the fascist ideology. In 1990, former prime minister Brian Mulroney apologized for the war internment of Italian Canadians to a Toronto meeting of the National Congress of Italian Canadians. In May 2009, Massimo Pacetti introduced bill C-302, an "Act to recognize the injustice that was done to persons of Italian origin through their "enemy alien" designation and internment during the Second World War, and to provide for restitution and promote education on Italian Canadian history [worth $2.5 million]", which was passed by the House of Commons on April 28, 2010; Canada Post was also to issue a commemorative postage stamp commemorating the internment of Italian Canadian citizens, however, Bill C-302 did not pass through the necessary stages to become law. In 2021, prime minister Justin Trudeau formally apologized for the war internment of Italian Canadians, in the House of Commons.

A second wave occurred after World War II when Italians, especially from the Lazio, Abruzzo, Molise, Apulia, Campania, Calabria, and Sicily regions, left the war-impoverished country for opportunities in a young and growing country. A small number of Istrian Italians and Dalmatian Italians also immigrated to Canada during the Istrian-Dalmatian exodus, leaving their homelands, which were lost to Italy and annexed to Yugoslavia after the Treaty of Peace with Italy, 1947. Between the early 1950s and the mid-1960s, approximately 20,000 to 30,000 Italians immigrated to Canada each year. Between 1946 and 1967, more than 90 percent of Italian immigrants took advantage of the sponsorship system whereby they were admitted into Canada if sponsored by relatives residing in Canada that would assume the financial responsibility for them during their settlement period. In the late 1960s, the Italian economy experienced a period of growth and recovery, removing one of the primary incentives for emigration. In 1967, the sponsorship system was restricted, instead basing immigrant selection on labour-market considerations, also decreasing the influx of Italian immigration. 90 percent of the Italians who immigrated to Canada after World War II remained in Canada, and decades after that period, the community still had fluency in the Italian language.

Pier 21 in Halifax, Nova Scotia was an influential port of Italian immigration between 1928 until it ceased operations in 1971, where 471,940 individuals came to Canada from Italy, making them the third largest ethnic group to immigrate to Canada during that time period.

The rapid growth of the metropolitan areas that had attracted Italian immigrants, created a strong demand for construction work, and by the 1960s, more than 15,000 Italian men worked in Toronto's construction industry, representing one third of all construction workers in the city at that time. Others started small businesses such as barber shops, grocery stores and bakeries that created Italian ethnic enclaves. Italian women who entered the workforce often worked in the garment and clothing industry. The importance of the family unit of Italian Canadians has provided a central role in the adaptation of newer socioeconomic realities. A mid-1960s study conducted in Montreal found that two in three Canadian-born Italians had their nearest relative living in the same building as them or within a five-minute walking distance, and that more than half of those sampled had chosen to buy a house in a given area due to familiarity and because relatives and other Italian Canadians lived in the vicinity. 75 percent of Italians that immigrated after World War II were employed in low-income occupations, but by the mid-1980s, the children of immigrants had achieved a level of higher education comparable to the national average. By the 1980s, 86 percent of Italian Canadians owned a home, compared to 70 percent of the general population.

In 2010, the Government of Ontario passed Bill 103 with royal assent proclaiming the month of June as Italian Heritage Month. On May 17, 2017, the Minister of Canadian Heritage Mélanie Joly passed a unanimous motion, Motion 64, in the House of Commons to recognize the month of June as Italian Heritage Month across Canada — a time to recognize, celebrate and raise awareness of the Italian community in Canada, one of the largest outside of Italy.

Demographics

Ethnicity
As of the 2021 census, 1,546,390 Canadian residents stated they had Italian ancestry, comprising 4.3 percent of Canada's population, marking a 2.6 percent decrease from the 1,587,970 population of the 2016 census. From the 1,587,970, 671,510 were single ethnic origin responses, while the remaining 874,880 were multiple ethnic origin responses. The majority live in Ontario, over 900,000, (seven percent of the population), while over 300,000 live in Quebec (four percent of the population) — constituting for almost 80 percent of the national population.

Language and immigration
As of 2021, of the 1,546,390 Italian Canadians, 204,070 are Italian born immigrants, with 319,505 claiming Italian as their mother tongue.

Italian Canadian culture

Radio and television 

Son to Italian immigrants, Johnny Lombardi was born in The Ward in 1915, and went on to found one of the first multilingual radio stations in Canada, CHIN in 1966, in Palmerston–Little Italy.

Dan Iannuzzi founded the first multicultural television station in Canada (CFMT-TV), which began operations in Toronto in 1979. Now owned by Rogers Sports & Media, it is one of the flagship stations of the Canadian multilingual network Omni Television.

Montreal's CJNT dubbed some of E!'s programming, including documentary-based shows such as E! True Hollywood Story, in Spanish, Portuguese and Italian, to help partially fulfill CJNT's ethnic programming requirements.

Telelatino (TLN) is a Canadian English-language specialty channel that primarily broadcasts lifestyle programming surrounding the Latin American and Italian cultures, including cooking and travel-related programs, as well as coverage of international soccer, and mainstream television series and films. Telebimbi is an Italian language specialty channel owned by TLN Media Group that broadcasts programming primarily aimed at children.

Rai Italia, Mediaset Italia and Mediaset TGCOM 24 are also popular Italian-made channels that can be purchased.

Newspapers and magazines 

The first Italian-language newspaper in Canada was Il Lavoratore, an anti-Fascist publication which was founded in Toronto in 1936 and active for two years. Then came La Voce degli Italo Canadesi, founded in Toronto (1938-1940) and Il Cittadino Canadese, founded in Montreal in 1941, followed by La Vittoria of Toronto, in 1942-1943. After WWII came Il Corriere Italiano, founded by Alfredo Gagliardi in Montreal in the early 1950s. Corriere Canadese, founded by Dan Iannuzzi in 1954, is Canada's only Italian-language daily today and is published in Toronto; its weekend (English-language) edition is published as Tandem.

Other newspapers include Il Marco Polo (Vancouver), founded in 1974, Insieme (Montreal), Lo Specchio (Toronto), L'Ora di Ottawa (Ottawa) and Il Postino (Ottawa). Il Postino was established in 2000, by a young group of local Ottawa Italian Canadians to convey the history of the Italian community in Ottawa. Insieme was founded by the Italian Catholic parishes of Montreal but has since been put under private ownership. It nevertheless retains an emphasis on religious articles.

Eyetalian magazine was launched in 1993 as a challenging, independent magazine of Italian-Canadian culture. It encountered commercial difficulty, and leaned towards a general lifestyle magazine format before concluding publication later in the 1990s. Italo of Montreal is published sporadically and is written in Italian, with some articles in French and English, dealing with current affairs and community news. La Comunità, while an older publication, was taken over by the youth wing of the National Congress of Italian Canadians (Québec chapter) in the late 1990s. It experimented with different formats but was later cancelled due to lack of funding. In the 1970s the trilingual arts magazine Vice Versa flourished in Montreal. In, 2003 Domenic Cusmano founded Accenti, the magazine which focused on culture and Italian-Canadian authors.

Literature 

Italian Canadian literature emerged in the 1970s as young Italian immigrants began to complete university degrees across Canada. This creative writing exists in English, French, or Italian. Some writers like Antonio D'Alfonso, Marco Micone, Alexandre Amprimoz and Filippo Salvatore are bilingual and publish in two languages. The older generation of authors like Maria Ardizzi, Romano Perticarini, Giovanni Costa and Tonino Caticchio publish in Italian or in bilingual volumes. In English the most notable names are novelists Frank G. Paci, Nino Ricci, Caterina Edwards, Michael Mirolla and Darlene Madott. Poets who write in English include Mary di Michele, Pier Giorgio Di Cicco and Gianna Patriarca. In 1986 these authors established the Association of Italian-Canadian Writers, and by 2001 there were over 100 active writers publishing books of poetry, fiction, drama and anthologies. With the 1985 publication of Contrasts: Comparative Essays on Italian-Canadian Writing by Joseph Pivato, the academic study of this literature started, leading to the exploration of other ethnic minority writing in Canada and inspiring other scholars such as Licia Canton, Pasquale Verdicchio and George Elliott Clarke. The important collections of literary works are: The Anthology of Italian-Canadian Writing (1998) edited by Joseph Pivato and Pillars of Lace: The Anthology of Italian-Canadian Women Writers (1998) edited by Marisa De Franceschi. See also Writing Cultural Difference: Italian-Canadian Creative and Critical Works (2015) editors Giulia De Gasperi, Maria Cristina Seccia, Licia Canton and Michael Mirolla.

Education 

On October 25, 2012, the Government of Canada announced its support of a project highlighting Italian-Canadian contribution to Canada. Funding aimed at raising awareness of the contributions of Canadians of Italian heritage in the development and settlement of Canada was announced by Julian Fantino, Minister of International Cooperation and Member of Parliament for Vaughan, on behalf of Citizenship and Immigration Canada.

Citizenship and Immigration Canada is providing $248,397 in funding under the Inter-Action Program to the Toronto district of the National Council of Italian Canadians (NCIC) to develop a curriculum intended for both primary and secondary level classes. The project is entitled "Italian Heritage in Canada Curriculum."

"The Inter-Action program aims to create opportunities for different cultural and faith communities to build bridges and promote intercultural understanding," said Minister Fantino. "This project will help promote a greater awareness of the many contributions of the Italian Canadian community to the building of Canada."

The curriculum will start with the Discovery of North America on June 24, 1497, and then turn to the various waves of immigrants that came to Canada from the 1800s to the present time. It will showcase Italian immigration to urban and rural areas across Canada and their contributions to the settlement of the west, then the building of railways, cities and infrastructure. The curriculum will recount the work of earlier generations of Italians, their plight during World War II when many were interned, and the contributions of more recent generations of Canadians of Italian heritage. It will also explore the wartime internment experiences of other cultural communities as well as their contributions to the building of Canada.

Notable Italian Canadians

Italian districts in Canada

Alberta 
 Little Italy, Edmonton

Greater Montreal area 
 LaSalle, Quebec
 Laval, Quebec
 Little Italy, Montreal
 Montréal-Nord
 Notre-Dame-de-Grâce, Montreal (Saint-Raymond)
 Rivière-des-Prairies, Montreal
 Saint-Léonard—Saint-Michel
 Saint-Leonard, Quebec
 Saint-Michel, Montreal
 Via Italia

Ottawa 
 Little Italy, Ottawa
 St. Anthony of Padua (Ottawa)

Hamilton 
 James St. North
 Stoney Creek

Greater Toronto Area 
 Little Italy, Toronto
 Palmerston-Little Italy, Toronto
 Corso Italia – St. Clair Avenue West
 Corso Italia-Davenport, Toronto
 Maple Leaf, Toronto
 Downsview, Toronto
 Woodbridge, Vaughan
 Nobleton, King
 Bolton, Caledon

Windsor, Ontario 
 Via Italia, Erie St.

British Columbia 
 Burnaby, British Columbia
 Little Italy, Vancouver
 Trail, British Columbia

Manitoba 
 Little Italy, Winnipeg

See also 

 Canada–Italy relations
 Demographics of Canada
 Italian Canadians in the Greater Toronto Area
 Italian Canadians in Greater Montreal
 Italian Walk of Fame
 Languages of Canada

Notes

References

Further reading 

 Colantonio, Frank (1997). From the Ground up: an Italian Immigrant's Story. Toronto, Ont.: Between the Lines. 174 p., ill. with b&w photos.
 

 
 
 
  Pivato,  Joseph  (1994)  Echo: Essay on Other Literatures. Toronto: Guernica Editions.
 
 Harney, Nicholas DeMaria. "Ethnicity, Social Organization, and Urban Space: A Comparison of Italians in Toronto and Montreal" (Chapter 6). In: Sloan, Joanne (editor). Urban Enigmas: Montreal, Toronto, and the Problem of Comparing Cities (Volume 2 of Culture of Cities). McGill-Queen's Press (MQUP), January 1, 2007. , 9780773577077. Start p. 178.

External links 

 Italian Canadians as Enemy Aliens: Memories of World War II
 The Canadian Museum of Civilization - Italian Canadian Heritage
 Canadian Italians at The Canadian Encyclopedia
 Bibliography
 A History of Italian-Canadian Writing
 History of Ours: History of Italo-Canadian People in Brantford
 Italian Canadians in Italy
 Multicultural Canada website includes digitized books, newspapers and documents, as well as Italian Canadian women oral history and photographic education.

Ethnic groups in Canada

 
Canada–Italy relations
C